The Mitsubishi Lancer Evolution, popularly referred to as the 'Evo', is a sports sedan and rally car based on the Lancer that was manufactured by Japanese manufacturer Mitsubishi Motors from 1992 until 2016. There have been ten official versions to date, and the designation of each model is most commonly a Roman numeral. All generations use two-litre intercooled turbo inline four-cylinder engines and all-wheel drive systems.

The Evolution was originally intended only for Japanese markets, but demand on the "grey import" market led the Evolution series to be offered through Ralliart dealer networks in the United Kingdom and in various European markets from around 1998. Mitsubishi decided to export the eighth generation Evolution to the United States in 2003 after witnessing the success Subaru had in that market the previous year with the Subaru Impreza WRX.

However, sources say Mitsubishi had already been producing cars with more power but had been underrating the official power outputs in order to comply with the agreement.

The tenth and final generation of the Lancer Evolution, the Evolution X, was launched in Japan in 2007, and overseas markets in 2008. The Evolution X was produced for almost 10 years until Mitsubishi retired the Lancer Evolution in April 2016.



Evolution I

The first Lancer Evolution used the 2.0 L turbocharged DOHC engine and AWD drivetrain from the original Galant VR-4 in a Lancer chassis, and was sold in GSR and RS models. This engine was also used in the Mitsubishi RVR with the Hyper Sports Gear trim package, and the Mitsubishi Chariot Resort Runner GT. The RS was a stripped-down version that lacked power windows and seats, anti-lock brakes, a rear wiper, and had steel wheels to weigh approximately  less than the  GSR, ready for racing or tuning. The RS version was released with a mechanical plate type rear limited-slip differential (LSD). The GSR came with all of the conveniences of a typical street car, including a digital screen climate control system. The GSR version of the Evolution I was the only Evolution Lancer released with a viscous limited-slip rear differential (VLSD). The subsequent Evolution Lancer models all featured rear mechanical plate type LSD's.

Evolution II

The Evolution II was upgraded in December 1993, and was produced until February 1995. It mainly consisted of handling improvements, including minor wheelbase adjustments, lighter front swaybar that connected via swaybar links to the front struts, bodywork tweaks including a larger spoiler, and tires that were  wider. This Evolution also has a  fuel tank. Most cars came with 15-inch OZ 5-spoke wheels from the factory, although some RS models sold to privateer racing teams left the factory with steel wheels.

Evolution III

February 1995 saw the arrival of the Evolution III, following a pre-release in 1993 which had several improvements over the previous models. New, more aggressive styling and a new nose moulding improved the air supply to the radiator, intercooler and brakes. New side skirts and rear bumper moldings and a larger rear spoiler were added to reduce lift.

Evolution IV

The Lancer platform was redesigned in 1996, and along with it, the Evolution. The engine and transaxle were rotated 180° to better balance the weight and eliminate torque steer.

There were two versions available, the RS and GSR. The RS version was produced as a competition car with a limited-slip front differential and a friction type LSD at the rear. It also came with GLX seats and a choice of either 15-inch or 16-inch OZ lightweight racing wheels. The RS also had wind-up windows, optional air conditioning in some models, and a few extra brace bars to strengthen the chassis, one behind the front grille and another across the boot floor, and an aluminum rear strut tower brace.

Mitsubishi's new Active Yaw Control appeared as a factory standard on the GSR model, which used steering, throttle input sensors and g sensors to computer-hydraulically control torque split individually to the rear wheels 

The Evolution IV can be distinguished by its two large fog lights in the front bumper (option on RS version), and the newly designed tail lights on the rear, which became a standard design to Evolution V, which would become yet another trademark of the Evolution series, note the RS has no light mounts on the boot/trunk for further weight saving.

This new generation was slightly heavier than previous Evo's—the GSR in particular due to the added technology systems—but to counter this, the car produced even more power—the weight of the RS being  and the GSR being  (Sunroof model ).

Much of the technical improvements for this generation were also used in the second generation Mitsubishi RVR originally sold only in Japan but since exported to Australia and New Zealand. The Evolution IV was the last model to be considered "compact" according to Japanese dimension regulations.

RS – "Rally Sport" – Shortened close-ratio 5-speed transmission, minimal interior, front worm gear LSD and rear 1.5-way LSD, front end crossbar, 15-inch steel rims, Lancer GLXi Front Seats (non-bucket seats), manual windows and mirrors. (Optional: manual air conditioning, PIAA front fog lights, anti-lock brakes, Lamco-Mitsubishi boost gauge.)
GSR – "Gran Sport Racing" – 5-speed manual transmission, AYC (Active Yaw Control), anti-lock brakes, black-red Recaro front bucket seats, full auto air conditioner, double-din audio with rear windscreen integrated antenna, PIAA front fog lights, power windows, 16-inch OZ Racing F1 wheels, rear windscreen wiper, optional: sunroof, Lamco-Mitsubishi boost gauge.

Evolution V

Many aspects of the car were changed such as:
The interior was upgraded in the GSR version with a better class of Recaro seats.
The body kit had flared arches at the front and rear and a new aluminum rear spoiler replaced the IV FRP version and gave an adjustable angle of attack to alter rear downforce. (In process of doing so, the Evolution V onwards was no longer considered "compact" according to Japanese dimension regulations, requiring Japanese owners to pay an increased annual tax as the car was now  wider than regulated limit of ).
The engine was strengthened in a few areas and the cam duration was increased. The pistons were lighter with a smaller skirt area. 510 cc injectors were replaced with 560 cc injectors for better engine reliability due to more electrical "headroom" and the ECU was changed to include a flash ROM, allowing more boost pressure to the same TD05-HR as the Mitsubishi Evolution IV.

Furthermore, the turbocharger was again improved.
 RS – "rally sport" close-ratio 5-speed transmission, minimal interior, rally suspension, 1.5-way LSD, auto air conditioner, Enkei wheels, Recaro bucket seats, Brembo brakes, power windows are available as an option).
 GSR – 5-speed, gauge pack, AYC (Active Yaw Control), anti-lock brakes, Recaro front bucket and rear seat, auto air-conditioner, double-din audio, power windows, Brembo brakes.

Evolution VI

The Evolution VI's changes mainly focused on cooling and engine durability. It received a larger intercooler, larger oil cooler, and new pistons, along with a titanium-aluminide turbine wheel for the RS model, which was a first in a production car. The Evolution VI received new bodywork yet again, with the most easily noticeable change being within the front bumper where the huge fog lights were reduced in size and moved to the corners for better airflow. A new model was added to the GSR and RS lineup; known as the RS2, it was an RS with a few of the GSR's options.

Yet another special edition Evolution VI was released in December 1999: the Tommi Mäkinen Edition, named after Finnish rally driver Tommi Mäkinen who had won Mitsubishi four WRC drivers championships. It featured a different front bumper, Red/Black Recaro seats (with embossed T. Mäkinen logo), 17-inch white Enkei wheels, a leather Momo steering wheel and shift knob, a titanium turbine that spooled up more quickly, front upper strut brace, lowered ride height (with tarmac stages in mind), and a quicker steering ratio. Amongst other colours, the Evo VI came in either red (Tommi Mäkinen Edition only), white, blue, black or silver with optional special decals, replicating Tommi Mäkinen's rally car's colour scheme. This car is also sometimes referred to as an Evolution 6, Evolution 6.5, or TME for short. 4,092 units were produced in total and exterior styling was similar to that of its predecessor, the Mitsubishi Lancer Evolution 5.

Standard models
 RS – "rally sport" minimal interior, rally suspension, rear 1.5-way LSD as opposed to AYC, shortened close-ratio 5-speed transmission, optional Enkei wheels, optional Recaro Seats, optional air conditioning, optional Brembo brakes, optional power windows.
 GSR – 5-speed, gauge pack, AYC (Active Yaw Control), anti-lock brakes, Recaro front bucket and rear seat, auto air-conditioner, double-DIN audio, power windows, Brembo brakes.

Tommi Mäkinen Edition models

 RS – same as standard RS with close-ratio 5-speed transmission, lowered ride height, Tommi Mäkinen Edition front bumper, and titanium turbine (option with standard RS).
 GSR – same as standard GSR with lowered ride height, Tommi Mäkinen Edition front bumper, Red/Black/Green Recaro seats (with embossed T. Mäkinen logo), 17-inch Enkei white wheels and titanium turbine.

Evolution VII

In 2001, Mitsubishi was forced by the FIA to run in the WRC using WRC rules for building a car instead of the Group A class rules, and this did not need to follow homologation rules. The Evolution VII was based on the larger Lancer Cedia platform and as a result gained more weight over the Evolution VI, but Mitsubishi made up for this with multiple important chassis tweaks. The biggest change was the addition of an active center differential and a more effective limited-slip differential, while a front helical limited-slip differential was added.

The introduction of the Evolution VII also marked the first time an automatic drivetrain was included within the model lineup—the GT-A. Nicknamed the 'Grand Touring Automatic' version of the visually similar VII GSR and the RS2, the GT-A model was only produced in 2002 and had the following distinguishing interior and exterior specification: GT-A-only diamond cut finish  alloy wheels, clear rear light lenses and all-in-one style front headlights (later used on the Evolution VIII). The GT-A had the option of either no spoiler, the short spoiler (as per the Lancer Cedia; and later used on the Evolution VIII 260) or the thunder spoiler as used on the standard Evolution VII models. The most distinguishing feature was a smooth bonnet with no air-grills on it at all and the revised front bumper. Although offering inferior cooling capabilities, the bonnet was designed to give a cleaner line through the air with less air resistance at motorway speeds.

Interior could be specified with factory options of a deluxe velour interior, full leather or the Recaro sports seats. The GT-A interior was different in that it had chromed door handles, a different instrument panel (to show the gear selection) and chrome edged bezels around the speedo and tach. The GT-A also had additional sound deadening installed from the factory and the engine manifold and downpipe had been engineered to be quieter.

The 5-speed automatic gearbox had what Mitsubishi called "fuzzy logic", which meant that the car would learn what the driver's driving characteristics were like and would adapt the gear change timings and kick down reactions accordingly. The gears could be manually selected as with most Tiptronics via steering wheel + and – buttons (a pair both sides) or via selecting the tiptronic gate with the gear lever. The GT-A gearbox did not appear again in the Evolution VIII but has been installed in the estate version of the Evolution IX Wagon. It was replaced by the Twin Clutch SST gearbox since the introduction of Evolution X. For a time, Proton entered a rebadged version called the Proton PERT.
 RS – "rally sport", close-ratio 5-speed, minimal interior, rally suspension, LSD, Enkei Wheels, Recaro bucket seat, AYC (Active Yaw Control), Sports ABS (Anti-Lock braking system), Brembo brakes, double-din audio, power window are available as option.
 GSR – 5-speed, gauge pack, AYC (Active Yaw Control), Sports ABS, Recaro front bucket and rear seat, double-din audio, power window, Brembo brakes, Momo sports steering wheel.
 GT-A – Same option with GSR with 5-speed automatic transmission, gauge pack, deluxe velour interior, full leather or the Recaro sports seats, GT-A-only diamond cut finish  alloy wheels, clear rear light lenses and all-in-one style front headlights, and short spoiler option.

Evolution VIII

Originally a one-off model, sales were so successful in the U.S. that by 2005 it was available in four trims. The standard GSR model was available in Japan. The RS model was provided with a 5-speed manual gearbox and standard wheels (lacking excess components, such as interior map lights, power windows/doors, and radio). The SSL trim package came with a sunroof, trunk mounted subwoofer, and leather seats. All of these trim levels also included chrome headlight and taillight housings. To round out the lineup, the MR came with a revised front limited-slip differential, aluminum MR shift knob, handbrake with carbon fibre handle, 17-inch BBS wheels, aluminum roof, and a 6-speed manual gearbox. Additionally, the Evolution MR's taillights and headlights sported a new black housing.

The Mitsubishi Lancer Evolution VIII MR used slick-response Bilstein shocks for improved handling. The aluminium roof panel and other reductions in body weight lowered the centre of gravity to produce more natural roll characteristics. Detail improvements have also been made to Mitsubishi's own electronic four-wheel drive, to the ACD 5 + Super AYC 6 traction control, and to the Sports ABS systems. The Lancer Evolution VIII displayed at the 2003 Tokyo Motor Show took the MR designation traditionally reserved for Mitsubishi Motors high-performance models (first used for the Galant GTO). Other parts on the MR include BBS alloy wheels, the aforementioned Bilstein shocks, and an aluminium roof. In the United Kingdom, many special Evolutions were introduced, including the 260, FQ300, FQ320, FQ340, and FQ400 variants. They came with 260, 305, 325, 345, and 405 hp (194, 227, 239, 254 and 302 kW), respectively.

The "FQ" name stands for F——ing Quick, although it is not officially recognized by Mitsubishi due to the vulgarity behind the abbreviation. BBC's television series Top Gear demonstrated that the stock FQ-400 could keep up with a Lamborghini Murciélago around a test track. The Stig recorded a Top Gear Power Lap Time of 1 minute and 24.8 seconds (damp track), 1.1 seconds slower than the Murciélago's time of 1 minute 23.7 seconds (dry track). In a similar test conducted by Evo magazine, the Evolution was able to lap the Bedford Autodrome faster than an Audi RS4 and a Porsche 911 Carrera 4S.

The Lancer Evolution VIII was also the first Evolution to be sold in the United States, spurred by the success of the Subaru Impreza WRX which had been released there just the year prior. The Evolution VIII found its true competition in the Subaru Impreza WRX STI model the same year as the Evolution VIII's US introduction. With its 2.0 liter,  engine, the 2003 Evolution VIII was capable of achieving a 0–100 km/h (62 mph) time of 5.1 seconds. However, the internal components for the American versions were largely stripped-down versions of the specifications for the Japanese Lancer Evolution VIII. No US-spec Evolution model prior to the Evo X has active yaw control, including the 2006 Evolution IX. The American 2003 and 2004 GSRs are without the helical limited-slip front differential and 6-speed manual transmission. The 2004 US spec RS models, however, do have a front helical limited-slip differential. All 2003, 2004 and 2005 RS and GSR models have the Japanese Evolution VII's 5-speed transmission. The MR edition was introduced to the US in 2005, with ACD and the only model with a 6-speed manual transmission. The 2005 US spec RS and GSR have the ACD standard, and the front helical limited-slip differential is now standard on all models. The boost, timing, and tuning are also significantly lower than its Japanese counterpart, allowing it to adhere to the strict emissions regulations of the United States. Starting in 2005, the US model Evolutions were also fitted with a 5,500 rpm limit on launching in first gear to protect the drivetrain.

Most Evolution VIIIs have a carbon fiber rear spoiler with matching body-color endplates. Furthermore, the US versions of the Lancer Evolution VIII 2003–2005 were given bulkier rear bumpers than their Japanese counterparts to accommodate US safety laws in the form of the metal rear crash bar. All Evolutions have lightweight aluminum front fenders and hoods.

The basic RS Edition does not come with power windows, locks, or mirrors, an audio system, rear wing, sound deadening material, map lamps or an anti-lock braking system. All Evolution VIII RS models sold in the US are equipped with air conditioning.

The 2005 MR/RS editions came with an aluminum roof.

Additionally, Evolution VIII MR Editions come equipped with a 6-speed manual transmission, Bilstein shocks, optional graphite grey color (unique to the Evolution VIII MR), optional BBS wheels and an optional vortex generator. The MR Edition also received engine updates and reliability changes, the engine updates include larger turbo diameter mouth, updated cam profiles, lighter balance shafts and changed from single wastegate solenoid to dual solenoid. Exterior changes included HID headlights, updated taillights, and MR rear badging. Interior updates included black suede Recaro seats with higher side bolsters, carbon look dash trim, and MR badging on center console. Mechanical changes saw S-AWC rear diff changes, a larger oil cooler core, ion coated piston rings, reinforced cylinder head and 5-layer head gasket compared to the 3 layer.

According to Mitsubishi Motors of North America (info from evolutionm.net) the total production sales in the U.S. for the Evolution VIII (2003–2005) was 12,846. In 2003, the production sales for the GSR was 7,167 which was the only 2003 model year. In 2004, production sales for the GSR was 1,254 and for the RS was 263 for a total of 1,517 for the 2004 model year. In 2005 production sales for the GSR was 2,880, for the RS was 282, and for the MR was 1000 for a total of 4,162 for the 2005 model year.

Standard models
 RS 5-Speed – "rally sport", revised 5-speed, minimal interior, rally suspension, LSD, Enkei wheels, Recaro bucket seats, SAYC (Super Active Yaw Control)(Not available on USDM models), Sports ABS (Anti-Lock braking system), Brembo brakes, double-din audio, power window are available as option. Color options for U.S. model: (2004) Rally Red and Weightless White. (2005) Rally Red and Wicked White.
 RS 6-Speed – same as RS 5-Speed with Enkei wheels as standard and a 6-speed manual transmission (6MT not available on USDM RS model)(with same option available as RS 5-Speed).
 GSR – 5-speed (Some 2003 and later GSRs imported from Japan came with factory 6 speed out of the MR Variant as standard) The manufacture plate will state what transmission the vehicle has from factory. gauge pack, SAYC (Super Active Yaw Control)(Not available on USDM models), Sports ABS, Enkei wheels, Recaro front bucket and rear seat, double-din audio, power windows, Brembo brakes, Momo sports steering wheel. Color options for U.S. models: (2003–2004) Apex Silver Metallic, Blue By You, Lightning Yellow, Rally Red, Tarmac Black Pearl, Weightless White. (2005) Apex Silver Metallic, Electric Blue Metallic, Lightning Yellow, Rally Red, Tarmac Black Pearl, Wicked White.

MR Models
 MR RS 5-Speed – same as RS 5-Speed, with aluminium roof, MR Badging, carbon fibre spoiler, gauge pack, grey interior color dashboard (same option as RS 5-Speed with Bilstein suspension, carbon look dash trim, black suede Recaro fabric seats, BBS alloy wheels, Vortex Generator).
 MR RS 6-Speed – same as MR RS 5-Speed with Enkei wheels as standard, engine and reliability updates, SAYC (Super Active Yaw Control)(Not available on USDM models), and 6-speed manual transmission (with same option available as MR RS 5-Speed).
 MR GSR – 6-speed transmission, BBS wheels, carbon look dash trim, Bilstein suspension, black suede Recaro fabric seat, MR Badging, optional graphite grey color, Vortex Generator, engine and reliability updates. Color options for U.S. model: (2005) Apex Silver Metallic, Graphite Gray Pearl, Rally Red, Wicked White.

The National Highway Traffic Safety Administration (NHTSA) has determined crash test ratings of Lancer of different model years:

Evolution IX

Mitsubishi introduced the Lancer Evolution IX in Japan on March 3, 2005, and exhibited the car at the Geneva Motor Show for the European market the same day. The North American markets saw the model exhibited at the New York International Auto Show the following month.

The USDM Lancer Evolution IX models: standard (Grand Sport Rally or "GSR" in some markets), RS (Rally Sport), SE (Special Edition) and MR (Mitsubishi Racing) varied slightly in their performance capabilities. Subtleties unique to each model accounted for variations in acceleration, handling and top speed. The RS excluded features that came standard on the SE and MR models (stereo system, power windows and locks, rear wiper, rear wing, trunk lining and sound insulation).

Although the RS is the lightest of the group, the RS did not manage to outperform the standard IX and the MR around a road course (even if only by fractions of a second). This was purported to be due to the lack of a rear wing on the RS. In a drag race, the three models are all about even. They are all capable of 0- times between 4.2 and 4.5 seconds, and can run  times ranging from 12.6 to 13.3 (12.7–13.0 USA versions) seconds depending on the model/driver. The RS model was produced for rally and racing teams who wanted a platform to build a race car from. It is stripped of all the creature comforts, and other upgrades that drive the price up for features that the race teams would not require.

The IX MR retained the features of the Evolution VIII MR, like Bilstein shocks, a 6-speed manual transmission, a rooftop vortex generator, BBS forged wheels, HID xenon headlights, foglights, accessory gauge package, "zero lift" kit, special badging and an aluminum roof. All models continued to sport Recaro bucket seats, Brembo brakes and Momo steering wheels as well. Additional revisions from 2005 included a closer gear ratio for the 5-speed manual transmission, new lighter Enkei wheels on non-MR models, a redesigned front end with a more efficient air dam (the most noticeable feature are the two small oval ducts to cool the intercooler pipes), and a new rear bumper with a diffuser undersurface to smooth out the airflow coming out of the car for non-US models. HID headlights were no longer standard equipment on the base IX (nor were they standard on the 2005 VIII), and were available only in the SSL package (Sun, Sound, and Leather), SE (Special Edition) and MR trims.

The US versions of the Lancer Evolution IX did not come with the AYC but the ACD was still present. The drivers can select from three different driving modes, "Tarmac", "Gravel" and "Snow", and the car's computer system relatively promotes the active center differential to change the differential locking which, despite popular belief, does not change the torque split. The differential is geared at 50:50 and cannot be changed by the push of a button. What this switch actually does is quite simple. Each setting determines how long the ACD will delay in freeing the center differential after a steering input is made. In addition, it will determine how much locking force the ACD will exhibit on the clutch pack and center differential.

Tarmac is the setting to be used in dry, paved conditions. In this setting, the ACD will almost immediately allow the center differential to go into a free state upon detecting a steering input. Additionally, this mode provides the strongest limited-slip clamping force of the three modes. Although the US versions did not come with the AYC, it did come with a rear 1.5way clutch type LSD (limited-slip differential), which limits the slip from both rear wheels causing less traction loss of the rear wheels. The most common setup is the 1.5 way LSD, locking on throttle and partially locking on braking. In racing, Lancer Evolutions are not equipped with AYC or ACD because it is believed that better lap times are achieved by pure driver skill without any computer based assistance systems.

One of the changes from the previous iteration of the Lancer Evolution, was the change in the engine, the new 4G63 came with MIVEC, Mitsubishi's variable valve timing technology, which drastically improves the fuel consumption by changing the valve timing on the intake cam. The MIVEC system is similar to Honda's i-VTEC system only that it doesn't change valve lift, only intake valve timing.

Three trims were available for Japan, Asia and Europe. Although all models used the same  engine, the torque differed from one model to another. In Europe, however, the Evolution IX was advertised to have . The GSR produced  of torque, while the RS and GT produced .

Standard models
 RS – "rally sport", revised 5-speed, aluminium roof, gauge pack, minimal interior, LSD and a titanium-magnesium turbine, left hand drive option available.
 GT – revised 5-speed, LSD, titanium-magnesium turbine, and Recaro fabric seat, with some of the GSR's features (mainly interior pieces).
 GSR – 6-speed, Bilstein monotube shocks, auto-air conditioner, Recaro leather with Alcantara bucket seat, aluminium roof, gauge pack, SAYC (Super Active Yaw Control), and double-din radio (this is roughly equivalent to the USDM MR).

MR Models (Mitsubishi Racing)
 MR GSR – same as GSR with BBS 17-inch alloy wheels, Lowered  Bilstein suspension, and MR colored front lip spoiler.
 MR RS – same as RS with MR colored front lip spoiler (auto air-conditioner, Recaro leather with Alcantara (material) bucket seat, double-din radio, Bilstein monotube shocks with lowered  suspension, and SAYC (Super Active Yaw Control) are available as an option).
MR Tuned by Ralliart – Based on Lancer Evolution VI Tommi Mäkinen Edition, The Japanese Lancer Evolution IX was exclusively tuned by Mitsubishi Ralliart features the almost same as the civilian Evo IX MR GSR except for carbon fiber front lip Spoiler, Official Ralliart livery, Ralliart RA04 17-inch Black forged aluminum wheels.

In the United Kingdom, the Evolution IX used a different model scheme based on the car's horsepower. An FQ-360 model was subsequently released as a successor to the Evolution VIII FQ-400. All four models were designed to run on super unleaded petrol only. The MR FQ-360 was also released in limited numbers (only 200) in the last year of production.
 FQ-300, 320, 340 – 6-speed, Bilstein monotube shocks, AYC (Active Yaw Control), super unleaded petrol only.
 FQ-360 – 6-speed, Bilstein monotube shocks, AYC (Active Yaw Control), Ralliart Sports Meter Kit, carbon front splitter, Speedline alloy wheels, super unleaded petrol only.
 MR FQ-360 – New turbo with titanium aluminium alloy turbo fins, Speedline Turini alloy wheels, Privacy Glass, lowered Eibach coil springs ( at the front/  at the rear), IX MR interior, super unleaded petrol only.

Four models were available in the US. All models used the same  engine.
 Standard – revised 5-speed, standard model
 RS – ralli sport, revised 5-speed, aluminum roof, gauge pack, minimal interior, also no radio
 SE – Special Edition, aluminum roof/hood, and front fenders, split seven-spoke forged aluminum BBS wheels in "diamond black" finish, HID headlights with integrated fog lights, red-stitched Recaro seats
 MR – 6-speed, Bilstein monotube shocks, split seven-spoke forged aluminum BBS wheels, aluminum roof, hood, and front fenders, gauge pack, HID headlights with integrated fog lights, vortex generator, front brake cooling ducts and custom MR badging.

All of the American models are the same in power, but may differ in performance. The only thing that sets them apart is the Evo RS, which is  lighter than the MR and SE models.

To the standard model, the Sun, Sound and Leather package added a power sunroof, HID xenon headlamps with integrated fog lights, a slightly different stereo head unit (with no integral amplifier), slightly upgraded speakers in the front doors and parcel shelf, a 4.1-channel amplifier under the driver's seat, a powered, trunk-mounted Infinity subwoofer, black leather seating surfaces, leather-trimmed door panels, slightly revised center armrests in the front and rear, and separate rear side headrests. This model deleted the GSR's headliner-mounted sunglass holder to make room for the sunroof.

The Philippines had the Evolution IX until in August 2008, which was offered in two trims, the entry-level RS offering a 5-speed manual transmission, Brembo 17-in. ventilated discs (4-Pot),
Brembo 16-in ventilated drum-in-disc (2-Pot) and almost the same features as to that of the GSR trim in the international version. Some RS models had the SAYC option, while some did not. The MR was the top-of-the-line segment, which offered almost the same features as to that of the MR trim in the international version. All of them are powered by the same  4G63 turbocharged MIVEC Inline-four engine.

Evo Wagon 
Mitsubishi also released an Evolution IX wagon in GT, GT-A models and a MR special versions. Variants came in 6 speed manual (GT, MR) or a 5 speed automatic (GT-A). The automatic variant uses a non-MIVEC 4G63 sourced from the Evo VIII with a smaller turbo for increased low down torque. It was only sold in Japan and imported to other countries as grey imports. Only 2,500 Wagons were produced.

VIN searching on epic-data.com has shown there was a total of 2924 Lancer Evolution Wagons created. This includes all GT, GT-A & MR versions even though Mitsubishi's 2005 Press Release said they intended to make 2500 Evolution Wagons.

Rarity: Approximately 50% of these cars had the 6 speed manual transmissions combined with the Evo IX MIVEC engine whilst the remaining wagons were GT-A versions.

The most common colours were Silver, Black, Blue, Grey. White is rare and Red was very rare.

The manual transmission GT Evolution Wagon didn't weigh much more than the Evo IX sedan but the additional  approx was due to its Steel turret, steel anti-intrusion bars in doors and the heavier foldable rear seat, along with extra weight in the tailgate and extra side glass. Evo Wagon GT-A are heavier (approx ) due to their automatic transmission and the additional weight described above in the GT wagon. Even though the Evo Wagon was made exclusively for the Japanese market some of these cars have found new homes in Europe, UK, Russia, Asia and Australia. Some of these exported wagons have been converted to Left Hand Drive vehicles for use in Germany and Russia. Compared to the Evo IX sedan, the Evolution Wagon received front seat which had lower bolsters for easier entry and exit of the vehicle. These less sporty seat were the OEM standard seats in the Australian delivered Evo IX sedan.

Evolution X

In 2005, Mitsubishi introduced a concept version of the next-gen Evolution at the 39th Tokyo Motor Show named the Concept-X, designed by Omer Halilhodžić at the company's European design centre.

Mitsubishi unveiled a second concept car, the Prototype-X, at the 2007 North American International Auto Show (NAIAS).

The Lancer Evolution X sedan features a newly designed 4B11T  turbocharged, all-aluminium alloy GEMA Inline-four engine. Power and torque depend on the market, but all versions will have at least . (JDM version), the American market version will have slightly more. The UK models were reworked by Mitsubishi UK, in accordance with previous MR Evolutions bearing the FQ badge.

Two versions of the car are offered in the U.S. The Lancer Evolution MR, with 6-speed Twin-Clutch Sportronic Shift Transmission (TC-SST). The other version is the GSR which has a 5-speed manual transmission system. The car also has a new full-time four-wheel-drive system named S-AWC (Super All Wheel Control), an advanced version of Mitsubishi's AWC system used in previous generations. The S-AWC uses torque vectoring technology to send different amounts of torque to the rear wheels.

It also features Mitsubishi's new 6-speed SST dual-clutch automatic transmission with steering-mounted magnesium alloy shift paddles. It has replaced the Tiptronic automatic transmission, hence the SST version replaced the GT-A version (which was used in Evolution VII and Evolution IX Wagon). A five-speed manual gearbox will also be available. The new Lancer Evolution will also incorporate Mitsubishi's next-generation RISE safety body.

The Evolution X went on sale October 1, 2007 in Japan, New Zealand & some in Australia also the 07 were rare as only these countries had gotten them January 2008 in the US, February in Canada (as the first version of Evolution in Canada) and in March 2008 in the UK. The Twin Clutch SST version was available in Japan from November 2007. Europe will follow with sales in May, GSR and MR version included premium Package. The introduction of the 2010 MR-Touring moved the car even further upscale. Leather and a sunroof became standard while revising the rear spoiler to just a lip spoiler. For the police car, the British Police decided to use these Mitsubishi Lancer Evolution Xs as police cars, and the Royal Malaysia Police (Polis Diraja Malaysia) also use Mitsubishi Lancer Evolution X as the Police Highway Eagle (Helang Lebuhraya Polis) patrol team. These patrol car fleet will probably be used by Highway Pursuit / Patrol or VIP Escort.

In 2014, it was revealed that Mitsubishi would discontinue production of the Mitsubishi Lancer Evolution after the 2015 model year. The company expressed a desire to refocus its efforts on crossover vehicles and electric vehicles.

Discontinuation
In March 2011, rumours of discontinuation of the Lancer Evolution program started when AutoCar UK's journalist Matt Prior wrote on his interview with Gayu Uesugi, Mitsubishi's Global Product Director, and quoted him saying  'The Lancer Evolution X, Uesugi told me, will be the last Evo. "There is still a demand [for the car]," he said, "but we must stop." Eyebrow up.'''

Mitsubishi Motors would later state that "Further to some comments published in the press recently, production of the current Lancer Evolution continues as planned. As for its successor, regulations and market feedback will dictate its engineering package & architecture. Stay tuned.." Industry analysts would read the statement as indirectly hinting that the Evolution nameplate will remain, but is likely to be an environmentally friendly powertrain (possibly electric or hybrid), inline with increasingly stringent emission and environmental regulations.

 Autocar UK later updated its blog post, adding references to EV, further confirming what industry watchers originally speculated. Most recent news shows that Mitsubishi has been leaning towards the Mitsubishi Concept PX-MiEV hybrid drivetrain, explaining that the electric motors will act as a turbo for the Evolution. Mitsubishi claims that their more "green" version of the Evolution will be just as good or even better in the performance category.

In October 2011, the President of Mitsubishi Motors, Osamu Masuko, confirmed to Autocar that work on the next Evo will start in 2012 and will go on sale within the following three years. It is said that the car will feature electric power from a hybrid drivetrain, maintaining the performance of 0-62 mph (100 km/h) time under five seconds while cutting  emissions. Furthermore, it was stated that the next generation of Mitsubishi Evo will be notably smaller than the last version

In late March 2014, it was revealed that the production of the Mitsubishi Lancer Evolution would end after the 2015 model year. The company plans on concentrating its efforts on crossover vehicles and electric vehicles instead. This was confirmed by Mitsubishi spokeswoman Namie Koketsu, who issued a press release stating "Mitsubishi Motors does not have any plans to design a successor with the current concept, as a high-performance four-wheel-drive gasoline-powered sedan. Mitsubishi Motors will explore the possibilities of high-performance models that incorporate electric vehicle technology."

Motorsports
Rally
The Lancer Evolution is unique among its competitors in the World Rally Championship in that it was a homologated Group A car slightly modified to be able to race competitively against the then newly formed World Rally Car (WRC) regulations from the 1997 season. Mitsubishi continued to adhere to Group A regulations until the San Remo Rally in 2001, World Rally Car class cars. Lancer Evolutions were successful in WRC Rallies from 1996 to 1999, mostly in the hands of Finnish driver Tommi Mäkinen, clinching driver's titles in four-consecutive seasons from 1996 to 1999 (in Evolutions III, IV, V, and VI), and with the help of teammate Richard Burns in clinching the constructors' championship for the first, and thus far only time in 1998. The Evolution however was replaced in late 2001 by the firm's first World Rally Car, named simply the Lancer Evolution WRC, which was driven by Makinen, Freddy Loix, Alister McRae and François Delecour with relatively limited success, until Mitsubishi took a sabbatical from the championship at the end of 2002. It was succeeded for the 2004 Monte Carlo Rally by the Lancer WRC04. Mitsubishi pulled out of the World Rally Championship after the 2005 season with the Lancer WRC05 still being driven by privateers including Italian former works driver Gigi Galli and the Swede, Daniel Carlsson, in the years following. The Lancer Evolution however still competes in the Group N category.

In some European markets, the Evolution was sold as the Mitsubishi Carisma GT, and indeed to this effect the works WRC team's second car in the late 1990s, usually driven by Burns and subsequently Loix, was customarily entered as a Carisma GT. Proton Motors of Malaysia raced Evolution III's, Evolution V's (most notable with Proton 1784 where Malaysian driver Karamjit Singh won the 2002 Production Car WRC) and an Evolution VII as the Proton PERT in various Asia-Pacific Rally Championship and APAC rally series.

Track racing
The Mitsubishi Lancer Evolution won the 2009 Australian Manufacturers' Championship with a trio of Evolution X models.

The Mitsubishi Evo has recently won and made runner-up in the 2011 Australian Manufacturers' Championship.

Most recently, (2005–2006) the CT9A chassis Evolution has been dominant in Time Attack (time trials) throughout the world. CyberEvo's CT9A chassis Lancer Evolution (now retired) previously held the OEM chassis record at Japan's Tsukuba Circuit for Time Attack, as well as the Australian record at Eastern Creek Raceway. Sierra Sierra Enterprise's CT9A chassis Evolution holds the U.S. Time Attack record. The Tilton Interiors CT9A chassis Lancer Evolution held the time attack record at Sydney Motorsport Park until October 2016 where MCA "Hammerhead" Nissan Silvia reset the record.

The Lancer Evolution VIII was used in Stock Car Brasil from 2005 to 2008, with Cacá Bueno won the series twice from 2006 to 2007.

The car won the 2008 and 2009 WPS Bathurst 12 Hour endurance race.

The Mitsubishi Lancer Evo has also been used by professional drifters in countries like Japan, Italy and Poland, with notable results being obtained by driver Naoto Suenaga of Team Orange.

Hill climbing
The Evolution IX won the European Hill Climb Championship 11 times since 2007, with 13 wins also in the FIA International Hill Climb Cup.

Awards
The Mitsubishi Lancer Evolution won Consumer Search's best Aggressive sports sedan in Best Sports Sedans in June 2006. During 2004–2005 alone it won six major awards, being declared "Sports Car of the Year" in Scotland and France, "Playboy Sports Car 2004" in Poland, "Best New Production Car Under €60,000" in Greece, "Sport Compact Car of the Year" in 2004 and 2005 (Sport Compact Car magazine) and "2005 All-Star" (Automobile magazine) in the United States and Motor magazine's Best "Bang for Your Bucks" Australia. Also in 2004, the Lancer Evo was presented with the Editors' Choice Award by Grassroots Motorsports. The Lancer Evolution X was named as the "Best Performance Car under $50K" by Canadian TV show Motoring 2009'', and won the Automobile Journalists Association of Canada's 2009 "Best New Technology" award. It was also nominated as one of the top 10 "World Performance Car of the Year", won the Automotive Excellence Awards' 2008 "Fun to Drive" category, and took Dave TV's "Sports Car of the Year" award in 2008.

References

External links

All-wheel-drive vehicles
Lancer Evolution
Rally cars
Sport compact cars
Sports sedans
Police vehicles
Cars introduced in 1991
Cars discontinued in 2016
2000s cars
2010s cars
Cars powered by transverse 4-cylinder engines
World Rally championship-winning cars

de:Mitsubishi Lancer#Motorsport und Evo-Modelle